Milliken Creek is an  stream in Napa County, California, that is tributary to the Napa River. Milliken Creek rises on the western slopes of the east side of the Napa Valley and flows through the Silverado Country Club property. Much of this watershed property had once been part of the Mexican land grant Rancho Yajome, which had been granted to General Mariano G. Vallejo. Most of this watershed was wilderness area to at least 1869, and thereafter the lower watershed was begun to be developed as pasture and grazing agricultural uses. In a 1989 stream survey by Earth Metrics, the steelhead fishery was found to be robust up to and including the Silverado Country Club.

See also
List of watercourses in the San Francisco Bay Area

References

External links
Napa River watershed

Rivers of Napa County, California
Rivers of Northern California
Tributaries of Napa River